Grégoire Barrère and Jonathan Eysseric were the defending champions and chose not to defend their title.

Gerard and Marcel Granollers won the title after defeating Zdeněk Kolář and Gonçalo Oliveira 6–3, 7–6(8–6) in the final.

Seeds

Draw

References
 Main Draw

Doubles
Bangkok Challenger - Doubles
 in Thai tennis